Constellations is the debut studio album by British-Japanese power metal band Esprit D'Air.

Background 
The digital album was released on June 30, 2017, and the physical version was released on July 7, 2017, through the band's own label, Starstorm Records.

Singles 
Esprit D'Air released four singles from the album—"Rebirth", "Guiding Light", "Ignition", and "Starstorm"—with accompanying music videos for each. A reimagined version of "Guiding Light" was later released in 2021.

Accolades
In 2018, Constellations was awarded Best Metal Album at the Independent Music Awards, judged by Slayer, Amy Lee of Evanescence, and Sepultura. The award was presented at the Lincoln Center for the Performing Arts, New York.

Teamrock.com featured "Guiding Light" as one of the Best 50 Rock Songs of 2017.

Track listing

Personnel 
 Kai – lead vocals, guitar, bass, keyboards, drums, production, programming, mixing & mastering
 Ellis – bass ("Rebirth", "Guiding Light", "Reminisce")
 Daishi – drums ("Rebirth", "The Hunter", "Versus")
 Koichi Shoji – recording engineering ("Rebirth", "Guiding Light", "Reminisce")
 Yoshisuke Suga – lyric writing ("The Hunter", "The Awakening")
 Shutaro Tsujimoto – production
 Choizilla – artwork

Charts

References

2017 debut albums
Self-released_albums
Esprit D'Air albums